In physics, specifically statistical mechanics, a population inversion occurs while a system (such as a group of atoms or molecules) exists in a state in which more members of the system are in higher, excited states than in lower, unexcited energy states. It is called an "inversion" because in many familiar and commonly encountered physical systems, this is not possible. This concept is of fundamental importance in laser science because the production of a population inversion is a necessary step in the workings of a standard laser.

Boltzmann distributions and thermal equilibrium
To understand the concept of a population inversion, it is necessary to understand some thermodynamics and the way that light interacts with matter. To do so, it is useful to consider a very simple assembly of atoms forming a laser medium.

Assume there is a group of N atoms, each of which is capable of being in one of two energy states: either
The ground state, with energy E1; or
The excited state, with energy E2, with E2 > E1.
The number of these atoms which are in the ground state is given by N1, and the number in the excited state N2. Since there are N atoms in total,

The energy difference between the two states, given by

determines the characteristic frequency  of light which will interact with the atoms; This is given by the relation

h being Planck's constant.

If the group of atoms is in thermal equilibrium, it can be shown from Maxwell–Boltzmann statistics that the ratio of the number of atoms in each state is given by the ratio of two Boltzmann distributions, the Boltzmann factor:

where T is the thermodynamic temperature of the group of atoms, and k is Boltzmann's constant.

We may calculate the ratio of the populations of the two states at room temperature (T ≈ 300 K) for an energy difference ΔE that corresponds to light of a frequency corresponding to visible light (ν ≈ 5×1014 Hz). In this case ΔE = E2 - E1 ≈ 2.07 eV, and kT ≈ 0.026 eV. Since E2 - E1 ≫ kT, it follows that the argument of the exponential in the equation above is a large negative number, and as such N2/N1 is vanishingly small; i.e., there are almost no atoms in the excited state. When in thermal equilibrium, then, it is seen that the lower energy state is more populated than the higher energy state, and this is the normal state of the system. As T increases, the number of electrons in the high-energy state (N2) increases, but N2 never exceeds N1 for a system at thermal equilibrium; rather, at infinite temperature, the populations N2 and N1 become equal. In other words, a population inversion (N2/N1 > 1) can never exist for a system at thermal equilibrium. To achieve population inversion therefore requires pushing the system into a non-equilibrated state.

The interaction of light with matter
There are three types of possible interactions between a system of atoms and light that are of interest:

Absorption

If light (photons) of frequency ν12 passes through the group of atoms, there is a possibility of the light being absorbed by electrons which are in the ground state, which will cause them to be excited to the higher energy state. The rate of absorption is proportional to the radiation density of the light, and also to the number of atoms currently in the ground state, N1.

Spontaneous emission

If atoms are in the excited state, spontaneous decay events to the ground state will occur at a rate proportional to N2, the number of atoms in the excited state. The energy difference between the two states ΔE21 is emitted from the atom as a photon of frequency ν21 as given by the frequency-energy relation above.

The photons are emitted stochastically, and there is no fixed phase relationship between photons emitted from a group of excited atoms; in other words, spontaneous emission is incoherent. In the absence of other processes, the number of atoms in the excited state at time t, is given by

where N2(0) is the number of excited atoms at time t = 0, and τ21 is the mean lifetime of the transition between the two states.

Stimulated emission

If an atom is already in the excited state, it may be agitated by the passage of a photon that has a frequency ν21 corresponding to the energy gap ΔE of the excited state to ground state transition. In this case, the excited atom relaxes to the ground state, and it produces a second photon of frequency ν21. The original photon is not absorbed by the atom, and so the result is two photons of the same frequency. This process is known as stimulated emission.

Specifically, an excited atom will act like a small electric dipole which will oscillate with the external field provided. One of the consequences of this oscillation is that it encourages electrons to decay to the lowest energy state. When this happens due to the presence of the electromagnetic field from a photon, a photon is released in the same phase and direction as the "stimulating" photon, and is called stimulated emission.

The rate at which stimulated emission occurs is proportional to the number of atoms N2 in the excited state, and the radiation density of the light. The base probability of a photon causing stimulated emission in a single excited atom was shown by Albert Einstein to be exactly equal to the probability of a photon being absorbed by an atom in the ground state. Therefore, when the numbers of atoms in the ground and excited states are equal, the rate of stimulated emission is equal to the rate of absorption for a given radiation density.

The critical detail of stimulated emission is that the induced photon has the same frequency and phase as the incident photon. In other words, the two photons are coherent. It is this property that allows optical amplification, and the production of a laser system. During the operation of a laser, all three light-matter interactions described above are taking place. Initially, atoms are energized from the ground state to the excited state by a process called pumping, described below. Some of these atoms decay via spontaneous emission, releasing incoherent light as photons of frequency, ν. These photons are fed back into the laser medium, usually by an optical resonator. Some of these photons are absorbed by the atoms in the ground state, and the photons are lost to the laser process. However, some photons cause stimulated emission in excited-state atoms, releasing another coherent photon. In effect, this results in optical amplification.

If the number of photons being amplified per unit time is greater than the number of photons being absorbed, then the net result is a continuously increasing number of photons being produced; the laser medium is said to have a gain of greater than unity.

Recall from the descriptions of absorption and stimulated emission above that the rates of these two processes are proportional to the number of atoms in the ground and excited states, N1 and N2, respectively. If the ground state has a higher population than the excited state (N1 > N2), then the absorption process dominates, and there is a net attenuation of photons. If the populations of the two states are the same (N1 = N2), the rate of absorption of light exactly balances the rate of emission; the medium is then said to be optically transparent.

If the higher energy state has a greater population than the lower energy state (N1 < N2), then the emission process dominates, and light in the system undergoes a net increase in intensity. It is thus clear that to produce a faster rate of stimulated emissions than absorptions, it is required that the ratio of the populations of the two states is such that
N2/N1 > 1; In other words, a population inversion is required for laser operation.

Selection rules

Many transitions involving electromagnetic radiation are strictly forbidden under quantum mechanics. The allowed transitions are described by so-called selection rules, which describe the conditions under which a radiative transition is allowed. For instance, transitions are only allowed if ΔS = 0, S being the total spin angular momentum of the system. In real materials, other effects, such as interactions with the crystal lattice, intervene to circumvent the formal rules by providing alternate mechanisms. In these systems, the forbidden transitions can occur, but usually at slower rates than allowed transitions. A classic example is phosphorescence where a material has a ground state with S = 0, an excited state with S = 0, and an intermediate state with S = 1. The transition from the intermediate state to the ground state by emission of light is slow because of the selection rules. Thus emission may continue after the external illumination is removed. In contrast fluorescence in materials is characterized by emission which ceases when the external illumination is removed.

Transitions that do not involve the absorption or emission of radiation are not affected by selection rules. The radiationless transition between levels, such as between the excited S = 0 and S = 1 states, may proceed quickly enough to siphon off a portion of the S = 0 population before it spontaneously returns to the ground state.

The existence of intermediate states in materials is essential to the technique of optical pumping of lasers (see below).

Creating a population inversion
As described above, a population inversion is required for laser operation, but cannot be achieved in our theoretical group of atoms with two energy-levels when they are in thermal equilibrium. In fact, any method by which the atoms are directly and continuously excited from the ground state to the excited state (such as optical absorption) will eventually reach equilibrium with the de-exciting processes of spontaneous and stimulated emission. At best, an equal population of the two states, N1 = N2 = N/2, can be achieved, resulting in optical transparency but no net optical gain.

Three-level lasers

To achieve lasting non-equilibrium conditions, an indirect method of populating the excited state must be used. To understand how this is done, we may use a slightly more realistic model, that of a three-level laser. Again consider a group of N atoms, this time with each atom able to exist in any of three energy states, levels 1, 2 and 3, with energies E1, E2, and E3, and populations N1, N2, and N3, respectively.

We assume that E1 < E2 < E3; that is, the energy of level 2 lies between that of the ground state and level 3.

Initially, the system of atoms is at thermal equilibrium, and the majority of the atoms will be in the ground state, i.e., N1 ≈ N, N2 ≈ N3 ≈ 0. If we now subject the atoms to light of a frequency , the process of optical absorption will excite electrons from the ground state to level 3. This process is called pumping, and does not necessarily always directly involve light absorption; other methods of exciting the laser medium, such as electrical discharge or chemical reactions, may be used. The level 3 is sometimes referred to as the pump level or pump band, and the energy transition E1 → E3 as the pump transition, which is shown as the arrow marked P in the diagram on the right.

Upon pumping the medium, an appreciable number of atoms will transition to level 3, such that N3 > 0. To have a medium suitable for laser operation, it is necessary that these excited atoms quickly decay to level 2. The energy released in this transition may be emitted as a photon (spontaneous emission), however in practice the 3→2 transition (labeled R in the diagram) is usually radiationless, with the energy being transferred to vibrational motion (heat) of the host material surrounding the atoms, without the generation of a photon.

An electron in level 2 may decay by spontaneous emission to the ground state, releasing a photon of frequency ν12 (given by E2 – E1 = hν12), which is shown as the transition L, called the laser transition in the diagram. If the lifetime of this transition, τ21 is much longer than the lifetime of the radiationless 3 → 2 transition τ32 (if τ21 ≫ τ32, known as a favourable lifetime ratio), the population of the E3 will be essentially zero (N3 ≈ 0) and a population of excited state atoms will accumulate in level 2 (N2 > 0). If over half the N atoms can be accumulated in this state, this will exceed the population of the ground state N1. A population inversion (N2 > N1 ) has thus been achieved between level 1 and 2, and optical amplification at the frequency ν21 can be obtained.

Because at least half the population of atoms must be excited from the ground state to obtain a population inversion, the laser medium must be very strongly pumped. This makes three-level lasers rather inefficient, despite being the first type of laser to be discovered (based on a ruby laser medium, by Theodore Maiman in 1960). A three-level system could also have a radiative transition between level 3 and 2, and a non-radiative transition between 2 and 1. In this case, the pumping requirements are weaker. In practice, most lasers are four-level lasers, described below.

Four-level laser

Here, there are four energy levels, energies E1, E2, E3, E4, and populations N1, N2, N3, N4, respectively. The energies of each level are such that E1 < E2 < E3 < E4.

In this system, the pumping transition P excites the atoms in the ground state (level 1) into the pump band (level 4). From level 4, the atoms again decay by a fast, non-radiative transition Ra into the level 3. Since the lifetime of the laser transition L is long compared to that of Ra (τ32 ≫ τ43), a population accumulates in level 3 (the upper laser level), which may relax by spontaneous or stimulated emission into level 2 (the lower laser level). This level likewise has a fast, non-radiative decay Rb into the ground state.

As before, the presence of a fast, radiationless decay transition results in the population of the pump band being quickly depleted (N4 ≈ 0). In a four-level system, any atom in the lower laser level E2 is also quickly de-excited, leading to a negligible population in that state (N2 ≈ 0). This is important, since any appreciable population accumulating in level 3, the upper laser level, will form a population inversion with respect to level 2. That is, as long as N3 > 0, then N3 > N2, and a population inversion is achieved. Thus optical amplification, and laser operation, can take place at a frequency of ν32 (E3-E2 = hν32).

Since only a few atoms must be excited into the upper laser level to form a population inversion, a four-level laser is much more efficient than a three-level one, and most practical lasers are of this type. In reality, many more than four energy levels may be involved in the laser process, with complex excitation and relaxation processes involved between these levels. In particular, the pump band may consist of several distinct energy levels, or a continuum of levels, which allow optical pumping of the medium over a wide range of wavelengths.

Note that in both three- and four-level lasers, the energy of the pumping transition is greater than that of the laser transition. This means that, if the laser is optically pumped, the frequency of the pumping light must be greater than that of the resulting laser light. In other words, the pump wavelength is shorter than the laser wavelength. It is possible in some media to use multiple photon absorptions between multiple lower-energy transitions to reach the pump level; such lasers are called up-conversion lasers.

While in many lasers the laser process involves the transition of atoms between different electronic energy states, as described in the model above, this is not the only mechanism that can result in laser action. For example, there are many common lasers (e.g., dye lasers, carbon dioxide lasers) where the laser medium consists of complete molecules, and energy states correspond to vibrational and rotational modes of oscillation of the molecules. This is the case with water masers, that occur in nature.

In some media it is possible, by imposing an additional optical or microwave field, to use quantum coherence effects to reduce the likelihood of a ground-state to excited-state transition. This technique, known as lasing without inversion, allows optical amplification to take place without producing a population inversion between the two states.

Other methods of creating a population inversion
Stimulated emission was first observed in the microwave region of the electromagnetic spectrum, giving rise to the acronym MASER for Microwave Amplification by Stimulated Emission of Radiation. In the microwave region, the Boltzmann distribution of molecules among energy states is such that, at room temperature, all states are populated almost equally.

To create a population inversion under these conditions, it is necessary to selectively remove some atoms or molecules from the system based on differences in properties. For instance, in a hydrogen maser, the well-known 21cm wave transition in atomic hydrogen, where the lone electron flips its spin state from parallel to the nuclear spin to antiparallel, can be used to create a population inversion because the parallel state has a magnetic moment and the antiparallel state does not. A strong inhomogeneous magnetic field will separate atoms in the higher energy state from a beam of mixed-state atoms. The separated population represents a population inversion that can exhibit stimulated emissions.

See also
 Laser construction
 Negative temperature
 Quantum electronics

References
Svelto, Orazio (1998). Principles of Lasers, 4th ed. (trans. David Hanna), Springer. 

Laser science
Statistical mechanics